

Acts of the Northern Ireland Assembly

}}

References

2023